The Uganda women's national field hockey team represents Uganda in men's international field hockey competitions and is controlled by the Uganda Hockey Association, the governing body for field hockey in Uganda.

Tournament record

Africa Cup of Nations
 2022 – 8th

African Games
 2023 – Qualified

African Olympic Qualifier
2019 – Withdrew

See also
 Uganda men's national field hockey team

References

African women's national field hockey teams
National team
Field hockey